Kehillat Kernow (The Jewish Community of Cornwall) is a Jewish community with about 100 members in Cornwall, England, associated with the Movement for Reform Judaism. Founded in 1999, its name is a combination of the Hebrew word kehillat (community) and the Cornish word Kernow, meaning Cornwall.

Services

Services take place fortnightly  on Shabbat mornings at 10:30 and are held in a local school, with alternative venues for High Holidays and some festivals. They are led by members of the community and, occasionally, by visiting student rabbis from Leo Baeck College.

The community uses a Torah scroll on permanent loan from Exeter Synagogue and also one that it received from the Royal Cornwall Museum in Truro. The scroll was previously used by Falmouth Synagogue, which closed in 1882. It was officially handed over by the Duke of Gloucester to Kehillat Kernow at a ceremony in the Royal Cornwall Museum on 28 May 2004.

Education

The community runs a cheder for children and young people aged 2 to 15.

Communication 
Its newsletter, Kol Kehillat Kernow, is published three times a year.

See also

 List of Jewish communities in the United Kingdom

References

External links 
 Kehillat Kernow official website
 Jewish Small Communities Network: Kehillat Kernow
 Kehillat Kernow  (Cornwall Community) & Truro Jewish Community on Jewish Communities and Records – UK (hosted by JewishGen)
 The Movement for Reform Judaism  
 Kennedy, Naomi: Cornwall's Jewish Journey, Faith Features, BBC Cornwall, 28 September 2007

1999 establishments in England
Jewish organizations established in 1999
Organisations based in Cornwall
Reform synagogues in the United Kingdom
Religion in Cornwall